Serge Jean Karel Quisquater (born 2 April 1965), known professionally as Sergio Quisquater or simply Sergio, is a Belgian singer and television presenter. Together with Sandy Boets, he formed the duo Touch of Joy. As the frontman of the band Sergio & the Ladies, he represented Belgium in the Eurovision Song Contest 2002 with the song "Sister".

Career 
Quisquater released his first record in 1987. He became well-known as the male half of the duo "Taste of Joy", together with singer Sandy Boets. They released several singles and albums. Later they changed their name to Touch of Joy and had some international successes.

Since 1999, Quisquater has hosted several television shows, and the Touch Of Joy project brought him new success with the song "I Can't Let You Go".

They called themselves "Sergio & the Ladies" and performed the song "Sister".

References

1965 births
Living people
20th-century Belgian male singers
20th-century Belgian singers
21st-century Belgian male singers
21st-century Belgian singers
Eurovision Song Contest entrants for Belgium
Eurovision Song Contest entrants of 2002
Flemish television presenters
Musicians from Leuven